is a Japanese web novel series by Tsutomu Satō. It was published on Shōsetsuka ni Narō, a web novel website, from October 2008 to March 2011. Satō reached a deal with Dengeki Bunko and began releasing his work in a light novel format beginning July 2011. The story takes place in an alternate history where magic exists and is polished through technology, and follows Tatsuya and Miyuki Shiba, siblings who enroll into First High magic high school. While keeping their connections to the infamous Yotsuba clan secret, they attempt to live their daily life in peace, but Tatsuya is shunned for his apparent ineptness and Miyuki is validated for her magical abilities.

In 2013, each story arc received a manga adaptation with varying manga artists and publishers. That same year, an anime television series adaptation by Madhouse was announced and aired from April to September 2014. The Irregular at Magic High School franchise had been localized for English by two companies: The light novels and one of the manga adaptations are licensed by Yen Press, while Aniplex of America licensed the anime series. The anime series was simulcasted on four networks, and was later made available on Netflix. An anime film featuring an original story by Satō premiered in Japan in June 2017, while a second season taking place after the anime series by Eight Bit aired from October to December 2020. The season was simulcasted on Funimation and Hulu. An anime television series adaptation of The Honor Student at Magic High School by Connect aired from July to September 2021. A film adaptation of the series' "Reminiscence Arc" aired in December 2021. A sequel anime was announced on January 1, 2022.

In 2020, a direct sequel called The Irregular at Magic High School Magian Company began being published. Set after the events of Volume 32, the sequel focuses on the protagonist Tatsuya Shiba and the others after their graduation from First High magic high school. A spinoff sequel called New – The Irregular at Magic High School: Maidens of Cygnus will begin publication in 2021. Its focus is on Katsuto Juumonji and the revelation about a new family member.

The series has been well received. The light novels appeared on Sugoi Japan's 2015 polls and since 2020, is one of the top selling series in Japan with 22 million copies sold. In addition, its manga and anime adaptations also appeared on top selling charts. English reviewers had mixed reception towards the anime adaptation. The complex technicality of magic within the series was received warmly, but the exposition was criticized for being heavy, unclear, and poorly executed.

Synopsis

Setting
The series is set in a world with an alternate history, where magic exists and has been polished through modern technology. However, the ability to use magic is determined by genetics, limiting the number of magicians in existence. Following the 20-year long Third World War that reduced the world's population to 3 billion, the world's superpowers shifted to these four nations: The United States of North America (USNA), New Soviet Union, the Great Asian Alliance, and Japan. In Japan, the magic community is informally governed by the Ten Master Clans in lieu of the government. Due to the limited number of magicians, they are treated as a commodity and are forced to enter magic-related schools and professions. Nine magic high schools exist in Japan; they each specialize in different aspects of magic and are simply referred to by their numbers.

Plot
The story follows Tatsuya Shiba, a bodyguard to his sister Miyuki Shiba who is also a candidate to succeed the leadership of the Yotsuba clan, one of the Ten Master Clans that govern Japan's magicians. They enroll into First High School which segregates its students based on their magical abilities. Miyuki is enrolled as a first course student and is viewed as one of the best students, while Tatsuya is in the second course and considered to be magically inept. However, Tatsuya's technical knowledge, combat abilities, and unique magic techniques cause people to view him as an irregular to the school's standardized rankings.

Characters

Main
  
Tatsuya and Miyuki are siblings of the same school year and children to Tatsurou Shiba and the late Miya Yotsuba with Tasuya being 11 months older than Miyuki; their parents had a loveless forced marriage, and when their mother died, their father married his mistress, Sayuri Furuha, leaving the siblings to live by themselves. Maya Yotsuba, their aunt and the current leader of the Yotsuba Clan, was the reason Tatsuya was born with the unique magic to decompose, reconstruct, and detonate matter (along with some gene manipulation). Out of fear of his powers, the Yotsuba Clan leadership of that time argued for Tatsuya's death, forcing Miya and Maya to take measures to ensure his survival: the first was Miyuki's creation with genetic enhancements in utero, who would act as a seal to Tatsuya's power; the second was to magically dull Tatsuya's emotions except for his familial love towards Miyuki; and the third was to assign Tatsuya to be Miyuki's bodyguard in order to develop his sense of loyalty towards her. During a family vacation in Okinawa, Tatsuya warded off an invasion by the Great Asian Alliance and joined the 101 Independent Magic-Equipped Battalion which is headed by Major Kazama Harunobu. At some point during his life, Tatsuya developed an interest in engineering magical technology and commercialized revolutionary technology through his family's company, Four Leaves Technology, under the pseudonymous identity Taurus Silver. He is voiced by Yuichi Nakamura (Japanese) and Alejandro Saab (English).

Miyuki is considered one of the strongest magicians in the world and is a candidate to succeed her Aunt Maya as the leader of the Yotsuba Clan. Her specialty is freezing magic, and her unique magic allows her to freeze a person's consciousness. In addition, half of her magic casting ability is used to seal Tatsuya's powers. Before the family vacation in Okinawa, Miyuki treated Tatsuya coldly akin to how the other Yotsuba Clan members did. She began to warm up to him and when Tatsuya saved her life, she devoted her entire existence to him. It evolved to the point where she disdains the touch of other males and expresses jealousy towards females around Tatsuya. Genetically different from Tatsuya despite being born from the same parents, Miyuki professes her love to him following their engagement under Maya's orders. She is voiced by Saori Hayami (Japanese) and Anairis Quiñones (English).

In the polls by Kono Light Novel ga Sugoi!, both Tatsuya and Miyuki ranked as one of the most popular light novel characters. Outside of the franchise, Tatsuya and Miyuki also appear in the video game Dengeki Bunko: Fighting Climax.

Supporting

Tatsuya's group
Tatsuya's group consists of seven classmates whom he spends time with in his daily school life. They often assist Tatsuya during investigations and dangerous situations.

 is the daughter of the Chiba clan's leader and his mistress, which creates a strained relationship with her family. She has a tomboyish and optimistic personality, and is considered one of the best swordsmen in the clan. Her magic is used to enhance her sword and combat techniques. She considers Mizuki to be her best friend and has a crush on Tatsuya. She is voiced by Yumi Uchiyama (Japanese) and Erica Mendez (English).
, commonly referred to as Leo, is the grandson of a Fortress Series modified magician. His grandfather was one of the few survivors of the Fortress Series' instabilities, which causes early death or psychosis. Leo inherited his grandfather's physical augmentations and fears he may also have inherited the Fortress Series' faults. During combat, Leo uses voice activated magic (an old fashioned technique) to fortify objects or his own body to augment his combat abilities. He is voiced by Takuma Terashima (Japanese) and Mick Lauer (English).
 is a girl with the disposition called crystal eyes which allows her to see the components of magic invisible to most people. Her ability mentally strains her, requiring her to wear glasses to control her vision. She has a timid, calm, and feminine personality, and is voiced by Satomi Sato (Japanese) and Xanthe Huynh (English).
 is Erika's childhood friend, a prodigy from the Yoshida clan which specializes in magic dealing with spirits. Years prior to the series Mikihiko failed a summoning ritual which created a psychological block and prevented him from using magic effectively. His involvement with Tatsuya restores his confidence, allowing him to regain his magical talents. He is voiced by Atsushi Tamaru (Japanese) and Landon McDonald (English).
 is a descendant of a group of extinct magicians referred to as the Elements. The Elements specialize in one of the six elements of magic and had loyalty genetically embedded into their genes. Honoka uses light magic, and her genetic loyalty is directed towards Tatsuya. She is voiced by Sora Amamiya (Japanese) and Kimberly Woods (English).
 is Honoka's best friend and daughter to an extremely wealthy man. Shizuku is a mature and tactful girl who rarely shows emotion. She inherited her mother's talent for oscillation magic. She is voiced by Yuiko Tatsumi (Japanese) and Ryan Bartley (English).
 is the niece of Honami Sakurai, Miya Yotsuba's guardian. Both Minami and Hoonami were artificially created by the Yotsuba to serve the clan as bodyguards, and they specialize in barrier type magic. Minami is Miyuki's junior and serves as her maid and second bodyguard. She is voiced by Kiyono Yasuno (Japanese) and Emi Lo (English).

Student Council and Disciplinary Committee
The student council is a group of students which provides a liaison between the teachers and students. Meanwhile, the Disciplinary Committee consists of students who are essentially rule enforcers. A third committee is the Extracurricular Activities Federation who ensures that school clubs don't come into conflict with each other. The three committees are closely related and work together to preserve the peace on campus.

 is the student council president during the Shiba siblings' first year at school. She puts on a coy and innocent facade but is actually mischievous and highly perceptive. Mayumi is talented as a sniper and her form of offensive magic involves firing dry ice as projectiles. During the course of the story, she manipulates Miyuki into joining the student council and Tatsuya into the Disciplinary Committee. She develops an attraction to Tatsuya and places him in awkward situations for fun. After enrolling into Magic University, her twin sisters, Kasumi and Izumi Saegusa, enroll into First High. Mayumi is voiced by Kana Hanazawa (Japanese). and Maureen Price (English).

Two people worked alongside Mayumi during the year. The first was  who was the leader of the Disciplinary Committee. Mari has a tomboyish personality but becomes completely feminine in front of her boyfriend, who is also Erika's next oldest half brother. For combat, she uses a whip like blade and uses magic to manipulate chemicals. Katsuto is the next head of the Jumonji clan and inherited the clans barrier magic, Phalanx: an impenetrable and perpetual barrier used for defensive and offensive purposes. Both the Saegusa and Jumonji are members of the Ten Master Clans, forcing Mayumi and Katsuto to be politically involved with the magic community outside of school. Mari is voiced by Marina Inoue (Japanese) and Amber Lee Connors (English), Naotsugu is voiced by Susumu Chiba (Japanese) and Howard Wang (English), and Katsuto is voiced by Junichi Suwabe (Japanese) and Kaiji Tang (English).

Azusa has an interest in magic engineering and suspects Tatsuya is secretly Taurus Silver. She is able to use a unique magic named after her, Azusa Dream, to forcefully pacify people. Azusa Nakajou is voiced by Saki Ogasawara (Japanese) and Michelle Marie (English), Kanon Chiyoda is voiced by Saori Onishi (Japanese) and Vivian Lu (English), and Kei Isori is voiced by Sōma Saitō (Japanese).

Others
 is a first-year student from Third High School and the successor to the head of the Ichijo clan, another of the Ten Master Clans. His combat magic includes manipulating air, water molecules, and his unique magic allows him to evaporate water within an organism causing it to explode. His code name is the "Crimson Prince". He got this name after the New Soviet Union invaded Sado Island in 2093. At age 13 Ichijo volunteered to help repel the invaders.  It is rumored that he devastated an entire regiment of regular soldiers by himself. He is often accompanied by his best friend, who is credited as discovering one of the sixteen codes fundamental to magic. Shinkuro feels indebted to the Ichijo family for adopting him after his parents' were killed in the Sado Island invasion and promises to serve them forever. His code name is "Cardinal George". After losing the nine school competition, they both seek to improve themselves to overcome Tatsuya. Masaki is voiced by Yoshitsugu Matsuoka while Shinkuro by Ayumu Murase (Japanese).
 is an undercover agent for the Ministry of Public Safety who infiltrates the school as a counselor. She takes both of her duties seriously and frequently assists Tatsuya in gathering information. In addition, Haruka's disposition enhances her innate concealment magic; she trains under Yakumo Kokonoe to further enhance her hiding abilities. Her code name is "Ms. Phantom". She is voiced by Sakura Tange (Japanese).
 is a master of ninjutsu, a minority and an older form of magic. He chooses to isolate himself from magician politics and spends most of his time gathering information and training his disciples. Tatsuya gets his martial arts combat training from him. Miyuki also gets some martial arts training from Sensei Kokonoe. He is voiced by Ryōtarō Okiayu (Japanese).
 is a Home Automation Robot, an android designed to serve humans. She was created and owned by First High's robotics club. During the Visitor Arc, she is used as a physical vessel by one of a group of ethereal supernatural sentient entities referred to as parasites. The parasite began identifying itself as Pixie, and due to Honoka's presence, has developed feelings of love towards Tatsuya. Tatsuya buys her to prevent the magic community from militarizing the parasite inside her. She is voiced by Nao Tōyama (Japanese).
 is a middle-man who orchestrated all major conflicts in the series. He is part of an unknown organization led by  who wishes to destroy the Yotsuba. Zhou is voiced by Kōji Yusa (Japanese).
, commonly referred to as Lina, is the leader of the USNA's magician army force known as Stars. Her military identity is Angie Sirius, and she is one of the thirteen publicly declared strategic magicians. Her maternal grandfather is Retsu Kudô's younger brother. She is voiced by Yōko Hikasa (Japanese) and Suzie Yeung (English).
 is the Patriarch of the Ten Master Clans and the head of the Nine Schools Competition Committee. His eyes are completely black. He has spoken about being in WWIII in which he rose to the rank of Major General. He knows Tatsuya's commanding officer, Major Kazama whose adjutant, Kyoko Fujibayashi (code name "Electron Sorceress"), is his granddaughter.  He also knows the real story of the Shiba siblings. Maya and Miya Yotsuba were both his students. He has expressed a concern that the Yotsuba family is getting too powerful. He is voiced by Motomu Kiyokawa (Japanese).

Publication and conception
The story was conceived around a protagonist whose abilities cannot be properly measured through standardized evaluation; as such, he is mistakenly categorized as a poor performing student or an irregular. This premise served as a basis for the character, Tatsuya Shiba. Satō has two processes for scripting the story arcs: the first is to create scenarios to have characters behave and interact in certain ways; the second is to plan a scene, then script the story so it leads to that scene. Satō professed that he does not feel his characters are alive or have a will of their own when scripting them.

Tsutomu Satō published his work on the online web novel website, Shōsetsuka ni Narō, between October 12, 2008, and March 21, 2011. At some point during his publication on Syosetu, Satō sent an original work to Dengeki Bunko under a pseudonym. The original work's setting shared similarities to The Irregular at Magic High School causing an editor to deduce his identity and offer him a publication deal. On March 11, 2011, the author announced his work is going to be published as a light novel under the Dengeki Bunko imprint. The author expressed some regret turning free content into paid commodity and cited his financial needs as the reason. The illustrations accompanying the light novels were done by Kana Ishida. The first light novel volume was unable to accommodate the first story arc; deciding against cutting content from the web novel, it was split into two volumes and released a month later. On March 9, 2015, Yen Press announced its licensing of the light novels for English localization through Twitter. Yen Press' first volume was released in April 2016.

In June 2020, it was announced that the novel series would be ending with its 32nd volume which was released on September 10, 2020.

In July 2020, both a direct book sequel and a new spinoff series were announced. The sequel, titled  began on October 10, 2020. The spinoff,  began publication on January 9, 2021.

The Irregular at Magic High School

Side-stories

The Irregular at Magic High School Magian Company

The Irregular at Magic High School Maidens of Cygnus

Media adaptations

Manga
The Irregular at Magic High School had several manga adaptations with various artists and publishers; each manga adaptation covered a story arc from the original light novel series. The first adaptation was by Fumino Hayashi and Tsuna Kitaumi and covered the Enrollment Arc of the light novels. The latest manga adaptation was drawn by Yuzuki N' and covers the President Election Arc.

Volume list

The Honor Student at Magic High School
A spin-off manga titled  by Yu Mori premiered in Dengeki Daiohs June 2012 issue. It was collected in eleven tankōbon volumes under the Dengeki Comics Next imprint. Yen Press licensed the series' tankōbon volumes for a North American release, and released the first volume in November 2015.

Volume list

|}

Anime

An anime adaptation of the light novel was announced during the Dengeki Bunko Fall Festival on October 6, 2013. It is directed by Manabu Ono and animated by Madhouse. It aired on Tokyo MX, GTV, and GYT from April 6 to September 28, 2014; nine other networks and three streaming services broadcast the series afterwards. The individual episodes were later encapsulated into ten DVD and Blu-ray volumes released between July 2014 and April 2015. LiSA sang the first opening theme titled "Rising Hope".

In March 2014, Aniplex of America announced its acquisition for streaming rights to the anime series; much later they unveiled their plans to release the series into three Blu-ray volumes which segregate the episodes by story arcs. Four networks simulcasted the series with English subtitles: these include Aniplex Channel, Crunchyroll, Hulu, and Daisuki. In June 2014, the Australasia distributor, Hanabee Entertainment, announced its licensing of the series for streaming and home media release. Months later, Netflix made the series available on their network. Animax Asia also began broadcasting the series in July 2015.
-
Three related media to the anime were created. The first is a super deformed short series titled  by Aniplex. These shorts were uploaded on Aniplex's YouTube channel, and was later English subtitled and uploaded on Aniplex of America's channel. An internet radio show titled , premiered on March 23, 2014, and is hosted by Sora Amamiya and Yuiko Tatsumi, the voice actresses for Honoka Mitsui and Shizuku Kitayama respectively; the radio show episodes was later made available for purchase on CD. The third is a radio drama DVD which was released in December 2014 and is based on the light novel's Recollection Arc.

An anime film titled  was revealed in the 19th light novel volume which was released in March 2016. The film is based on an original new story written by the series creator, Tsutomu Satō, and premiered in Japan on June 17, 2017. It is directed by Risako Yoshida and animated by Eight Bit. The rest of the staff and cast will reprise their roles in the film. In the United States, Aniplex of America released the film in theaters and on home video. The film takes places after the events of the eleventh volume of the light novel or during the commecial break of the eleventh episode of the series' second season.

At the "Dengeki Bunko Aki no Namahōsō Festival" event on October 6, 2019, a second season of the anime series adapting the "Visitor Arc" in the novel series was announced and originally scheduled to air in July 2020, but it aired from October 4 to December 27, 2020, due to the COVID-19 pandemic. The main staff and cast from the 2017 film are reprising their roles in the second season. ASCA performed the opening theme song "Howling", while Miki Satō performed the ending theme song "Na mo Nai Hana". Aniplex of America announced its acquisition the anime series, and originally announced that Funimation would stream it exclusively, but Hulu ended up streaming the series as well. On November 13, 2020, Funimation announced that the second season of the series would receive an English dub.

After the end of the series, it was revealed that the spin-off manga series, The Honor Student at Magic High School would get an anime television series adaptation, which aired from July 3 to September 25, 2021, on Tokyo MX and other channels. The series is animated by Connect and directed by Hideki Tachibana, with Tsuyoshi Tamai writing and overseeing the series' scripts, Ryōsuke Yamamoto and Takao Sano designing the characters, and Taku Iwasaki returning to compose the series' music. The opening theme is "101" performed by Sangatsu no Phantasia while the ending theme is "Double Standard" performed by Philosophy no Dance.

On February 28, 2021, an anime adaptation of the "Reminiscence Arc" was announced. It was later revealed to be a 60-minute television film, with the main cast and staff of the second season reprising their roles. It aired on December 31, 2021. The theme song is "Ripe Aster" by Kairi Yagi.

An unspecified sequel to the anime series was announced in January 2022.

Video games
Three video game adaptations have been made for the franchise. The first is The Irregular at Magic High School: Out of Order by Bandai Namco Entertainment. It is a 3D fighting game for the PlayStation Vita and was released on December 25, 2014. The second game is The Irregular at Magic High School: , a Japanese role-playing game by Mobage. It was made available for Android, iOS, and feature phone on June 9, 2014. The third game is The Irregular at Magic High School: Lost Zero, developed by BeXide and published by Square Enix. It was made available for Android and iOS on September 4, 2014.

Reception
The light novels have been well received. They were ranked seventh in Sugoi Japan 2015 polls and since 2011, was one of the top selling light novel series in Japan. In 2014, 5.3 million copies of the light novel were sold. In addition, its manga and anime adaptations also appeared on top selling charts. In 2017, the light novel series sold 7.7 million copies. Till 2020, the series has sold more than 20 million copies. As of December 2021 sale numbers exceeded 22 million copies.

Anime News Network had four editors review the first episode of the anime: Carl Kimlinger saw potential in its take on a typical anime premise, praising Tatsuya as the lead protagonist and its handling of mysteries surrounding the plot; Theron Martin, although hopeful because of its male lead and plot concept, expressed criticism towards the indistinguishable animation and constant exposition for the viewers; and Rebecca Silverman felt that it was bland and nothing special. The fourth reviewer, Jacob Chapman, expressed immediate dislike towards the series, criticizing it for lacking anything to engage the viewers and for being a lazy adaptation of a light novel, and concluding the review with "I can't even remember the last time I saw something with not a single redeeming factor or thing to recommend about it at all." Silverman reviewed the series future episodes. Plotwise, she praised the Enrollment Arcs underline on standardized testing, criticized the Nine Schools Competition Arc for its execution and weak exposition, and felt the characters were uninteresting. Silverman felt the series doesn't live up to its potential and cited the background music and stilted animations as possible reasons.

Chris Beveridge's review for Fandom Post was highly positive towards the anime series, calling it a dark horse contender as one of their top new anime series of the year. Beveridge praised the technical and fundamental aspects of magic in the series for breaking the supernatural approach other works usually take and liked the potential impact it could have on future events. However, while the reviewer liked the series' technicality, they noted it will frustrate certain viewers in that aspect. Richard Eisenbeis, writing for Kotaku, liked the characters, story, the complex and technical magic system, and mysteries. However, Eisenbeis criticized the exposition, citing it to be poorly timed, heavy, and failing to explain things with better clarity. He concluded his review by writing how the anime might have been great if a different director or screenwriting was hired.

Notes

Regarding works cited 
 represents the Light Novel of the series in the format of X.Y, where X represents the volume and Y represents the chapter. Chapter A represents the afterword of the novel.

Japanese notes

References

External links
  
  
 

 
2011 Japanese novels
2014 video games
2020 anime television series debuts
2021 anime television series debuts
2021 anime films
Action anime and manga
Alternate history anime
Android (operating system) games
Anime and manga based on light novels
Aniplex
ASCII Media Works manga
Connect (studio)
Dengeki Bunko
Eight Bit (studio)
Fiction set in the 2090s
Funimation
Gangan Comics manga
Fiction about government
Incest in anime and manga
IOS games
Japan-exclusive video games
Japanese fantasy novels
Japan Self-Defense Forces in fiction
Kadokawa Dwango franchises
Light novels
Light novels first published online
Madhouse (company)
Novels about magic
Military of the United States in fiction
Multiplayer video games
Novels set during World War III
Fiction about the People's Liberation Army
PlayStation Vita games
PlayStation Vita-only games
Fiction about robots
Robots in television
Role-playing video games
School life in anime and manga
Science fantasy anime and manga
Shōnen manga
Shōsetsuka ni Narō
Television shows based on light novels
Television series set in the future
Television shows set in Asia
Television shows set in Japan
Television shows set in Tokyo
Video games developed in Japan
Yen Press titles